Empty Vessels is an extended play by the Long Island indie rock band The Republic of Wolves. It was originally released on their web store on December 17, 2013. The EP was recorded, mixed, and mastered by guitarist/vocalist Mason Maggio at The Republic of Wolves' home studio. The EP contains acoustic and alternate versions of songs from their second album No Matter How Narrow.

Track listing
All songs written by Mason Maggio, Christian Van Deurs, Gregg Andrew Dellarocca, and Billy Duprey.

References

External links
The Republic of Wolves on iTunes
The Republic of Wolves on Bandcamp

2013 EPs
The Republic of Wolves albums
Self-released albums